Mayuli Latifa Martínez Simón (born 13 January 1984) is a Mexican politician from the National Action Party. From 2018 to 2021, she served as Senator of the LXIV Legislature of the Mexican Congress representing Quintana Roo.

Early years
Mayuli Latifa Martínez Simón was born on 13 January 1984 in Chetumal, Quintana Roo. She obtained a degree in law at the University of Quintana Roo.

Political career
Martínez joined the National Action Party (PAN) in 2002. From 2013 to 2016, she was councilor of the municipality of Othón P. Blanco, during the municipal presidency of Eduardo Espinosa Abuxapqui. She was a deputy of the Quintana Roo State Congress in the XV Legislature representing the XV district, with headquarters in Chetumal as of 24 March 2016. Within congress, she was the coordinator of the PAN parliamentary group, was president of the anti-corruption commission, citizen participation and autonomous bodies. She was secretary of the legislative points commission and of the planning and economic development commission. On 27 March 2018, she requested leave of absence from the position to be able to participate in the 2018 federal elections.

Senator of the Republic
From 1 September 2018 to 8 April 2021, Martínez was a senator representing the Quintana Roo in the LXIV Legislature of the Congress of the Union as a representative of the first minority of Quintana Roo. Within the Senate, she served as chairman of the Prime Legislative Studies Commission.

References

1984 births
Living people
Politicians from Quintana Roo
Women members of the Senate of the Republic (Mexico)
National Action Party (Mexico) politicians
21st-century Mexican politicians
21st-century Mexican women politicians
Senators of the LXIV and LXV Legislatures of Mexico
University of Quintana Roo alumni
People from Chetumal, Quintana Roo
Members of the Congress of Quintana Roo
Members of the Senate of the Republic (Mexico) for Quintana Roo
20th-century Mexican women